Craig Stephen Minetto (born April 25, 1954) is an American former professional baseball pitcher. Minetto pitched in parts of four seasons in Major League Baseball from 1978 until 1981 for the Oakland Athletics.

Career
Originally drafted by the Los Angeles Dodgers in 1972, and again in the secondary phase in 1973, Minetto did not sign. Instead, he attended San Joaquin Delta College for two years. He was then signed as an amateur free agent by the Montreal Expos in 1974, but he pitched one season in their farm system before being released.

Unable to find a job in American baseball, Minetto signed with the Fortitudo Baseball Bologna, a professional team based in Bologna, Italy and sponsored by Grappa del Cannonier.  He pitched there for a season, and later returned to the United States, where he was signed to a minor league contract by the Athletics before the 1977 season. 

Minetto went on to pitch in 55 games for Oakland over four seasons, then was traded to the Baltimore Orioles organization, pitching with their affiliate Rochester Red Wings from 1982 to 1983. In December 1983, he was traded to the Houston Astros for Bobby Sprowl and concluded his career at AAA Tucson Toros in the 1984 season.

In between, Minetto played winter ball with the Tiburones de La Guaira club of the Venezuelan Professional Baseball League during the 1978–1979 season.

Sources
, or Retrosheet, or Venezuelan Winter League

1954 births
Living people
American expatriate baseball players in Canada
American people of Italian descent
Baseball players from Stockton, California
Chattanooga Lookouts players
Delta College Mustangs baseball players
Fortitudo Baseball Bologna players
Gulf Coast Expos players
Kinston Expos players
Major League Baseball pitchers
Modesto A's players
Oakland Athletics players
Ogden A's players
Rochester Red Wings players
San Jose Missions players
Tacoma Tigers players
Tiburones de La Guaira players
American expatriate baseball players in Venezuela
Tucson Toros players
Vancouver Canadians players
American expatriate baseball players in Italy